The 1979 New York City Marathon was the 10th edition of the New York City Marathon and took place in New York City on 21 October.

Results

Men

Women

References

External links

New York City Marathon, 1979
Marathon
New York City Marathon
New York